Grace Academy is a mixed secondary school located in Coventry, England. It has an expanding sixth form which is part of the North East Federation. It was formerly Woodway Park School and Community College, and was converted into an academy on 31 August 2008 using the same buildings, prior to housing the new academy in new buildings on 24 February 2010

The academy was operated by Grace Foundation, a registered charity founded by Bob Edmiston, entrepreneur and founder of the evangelical international charity Christian Vision; however in April 2019 the Grace Trust closed and the academy became a member of the larger TOVE Academy Trust, lead school Sponne School, Towcester, Northamptonshire. According to its Annual Report and Financial Statements to August 2012, the Coventry school received annual government funding of £5,898,000.

On 20 August 2013 the school was among those named by The Independent and the British Humanist Association as adopting a policy similar in wording to the repealed anti-gay legislation Section 28. The academy is now fully in line with Coventry LA policies on sex and relationship education, which conform to recent government guidelines.

In October 2013, a letter from John Nash, Baron Nash showed that early access results were below the minimal standard with only 32% of pupils achieving 5 GCSEs at grades A*-C including English and mathematics – an 18% drop from 2012. An external education advisor criticised the quality of both teaching and pupil assessment.

In March 2014 the school was rated by Ofsted as inadequate and placed into special measures, but the OFSTED report of November 2014 stated that the school was not making enough progress towards removal of special measures. In March 2016 the school was moved out of special measures.

See also
 Grace Academy, Darlaston
 Grace Academy, Solihull
 List of schools in Coventry

References

Secondary schools in Coventry
Academies in Coventry
2008 establishments in England
Educational institutions established in 2008